Dawidowicz is a surname of Polish-language origin, meaning "son of David". The Russian and Belarusian form is Davidovich, Ukrainian: Davydovych.

Notable people with this surname:
 Aleksandra Dawidowicz (born 1987), Polish cyclist
 Janina David (born 1930), born Janina Dawidowicz, Holocaust survivor, British writer and translator
 Lucy Dawidowicz (1915–1990), American historian
 Paweł Dawidowicz (born 1995), Polish footballer

See also
Davidović, Serbo-Croatian

Polish-language surnames
Patronymic surnames
Surnames from given names